Wenceslao Paunero (23 February 1887 – 12 March 1937) was an Argentine fencer. He competed in the individual and team épée competitions at the 1924 Summer Olympics.

References

External links
 

1887 births
1937 deaths
Argentine male fencers
Argentine épée fencers
Olympic fencers of Argentina
Fencers at the 1924 Summer Olympics
Fencers from Buenos Aires
20th-century Argentine people